The Blue Creek Wind Farm spanning Paulding and Van Wert County became the largest wind farm in the U.S. state of Ohio at approximately 40,500 acres upon its completion in 2012. With a generating capacity of 304 megawatts (MW), it produces enough electricity to service the equivalent of about 76,000 homes. It was the largest private investment in the state in 2011, with the construction alone directly employing about 500 workers. The annual land lease payments, operations and maintenance employment, and property and income tax revenues provide an ongoing stimulus to the local rural economy.

Electricity production

See also 

 Wind power in Ohio
 Environmental impact of wind power
 List of wind farms in the United States

References

External links 
 Fact Sheet - Blue Creek Wind Farm
 VIDEO: Blue Creek Wind Farm
 VIDEO (short): Blue Creek Wind Farm

Energy infrastructure completed in 2011
Wind farms in Ohio
Buildings and structures in Paulding County, Ohio
Buildings and structures in Van Wert County, Ohio